State Highway 75 is a two-lane highway in the western United States that travels through the Sawtooth Valley of central Idaho. The highway's southern terminus is in Shoshone, and its northern is near Challis.  It is designated as one of Idaho's scenic byways and provides access to Sawtooth National Recreation Area and primarily follows the Big Wood River in the south and the main Salmon River in the north, divided by Galena Summit.

Route description

It continues northward as the Sawtooth Scenic Byway to pass through the Big Wood River communities of Bellevue, Hailey, and Ketchum. Sun Valley is accessible via a spur route junction in Ketchum at Third Street, which becomes Sun Valley Road.

It runs northward down the valley with the Salmon River to Obsidian and Stanley, with the Sawtooths to the immediate west and the White Cloud Mountains to the slightly more distant east.

At Stanley, the highway intersects with the northern terminus of State Highway 21, the Ponderosa Pine Scenic Byway from Boise, through Idaho City and Lowman.

History
In 1824, while searching the mountain wilderness of what is presentday Idaho, known to them as Columbia District, for beaver, Alexander Ross came up the Wood River and discovered Galena Summit on September 18.  Leading a large brigade of Hudson's Bay Company trappers, he wondered if he could get through unknown mountains and rocky defiles that obstructed his passage back to his base of operations at present Challis. Unwilling to turn back he pressed on to explore Stanley Basin and the difficult canyon beyond. When he reached Challis on October 5, 1824, he had traveled the route now followed by State Highway 75 from Bellevue to Salmon through mostly unexplored land.

The road itself dates back to at least 1926, when it was designated U.S. Route 93. The former U.S. Route 93 Alternate, running through Arco, was redesignated  in 1977 as U.S. Route 93, and this route was given its current state highway designation.

Spur route
In 2020, the Idaho Transportation Department proposed abandoning the spur route, transferring ownership at the request of Blaine County due to urban growth along the corridor.

Major intersections

References

External links

Idaho Transportation Dept. – Milepost log – State Highway 75
Roadcams – State Highway 75
Proto Photo.com - Scenic Route 75
 David Rumsey Map Collection – Historic road map (1937) – Idaho, Montana, Wyoming – Texaco (Rand McNally)
Idaho highway map (1956) – Shell (H.M. Gousha)

075
Transportation in Lincoln County, Idaho
Transportation in Blaine County, Idaho
Transportation in Custer County, Idaho
U.S. Route 93
Bellevue, Idaho